Steep Rock is a community in central Manitoba, on the eastern shore of Lake Manitoba. It is located in the Rural Municipality of Grahamdale. Road transportation is provided by Manitoba Highway 6 which connects Thompson with Winnipeg.

References 
 Steep Rock Community Profile
 Steep Rock Photos
 Steep Rock Beach Park

Unincorporated communities in Manitoba